is a Japanese animator, character designer, storyboard artist, and director. He is primarily associated with Gonzo, which animated his series directorial debut, Romeo × Juliet, and with Sunrise, where he served as series character designer of the Sgt. Frog franchise. He is a member of the Japan Animation Creators Association (JAniCA) labor group.

Works

TV Series
His and Her Circumstances (1998–1999; episode key animator)
Now and Then, Here and There (1999–2000; episode key animator)
Final Fantasy: Unlimited (2001; animation director)
Prétear (2001; episode director (episode 11))
Kaleido Star (2003; character design (with Hajime Watanabe), chief animation director, animation director (episodes 1, 26), key animator (episodes 1, 3, 17))
Sgt. Frog (2004; character design, animation supervision)
Welcome to the N.H.K. (2004; animation director, storyboard artist (ending credits sequence 1, Pururin opening credits))
Romeo × Juliet (2007; director)
Astarotte no Omocha! (2011; director)
Place to Place (2012; director)
Etotama (2015; director)
Aokana: Four Rhythm Across the Blue (2016; director)
A Centaur's Life (2017; chief director)
Merc Storia: The Apathetic Boy and the Girl in a Bottle (2018; director, series composition)
Deaimon (2022; director)
Chillin' in My 30s After Getting Fired from the Demon King's Army (2023; director)
Akuma-kun (2023; director)

OVAs
Gate Keepers 21 (2002–2003; episode director)
Re: Cutie Honey (2004; key animator (episode 3))
Kaleido Star: New Wings Extra Stage - The Amazing Princess Without a Smile (2004; character designer, chief animation director)
Kaleido Star: Legend of Phoenix ~Layla Hamilton Story~ (2005; character designer, chief animation Director)
Kaleido Star: Kaleido Star: Good dayo! Goood!! (2006; character designer)

ONAs
Etotama ~Nyan-Kyaku Banrai~ (2021, director)

Theatrical Films
Princess Arete (2001; key animator)
Mind Game (2004; key animator)
Sgt. Frog the Super Movie (2006; character design, chief animation director)
Sgt. Frog the Super Movie 2: The Deep Sea Princess (2007; character design, chief animation director)
Afro Samurai: Resurrection (2009; key animator)

References

External links
oichan-chi 

1975 births
Living people
Anime character designers
Anime directors
 
Japanese animators
Japanese animated film directors